The 2008 Tylenol Players' Championship is the last Grand Slam event of both the World Curling Tour and Women's Curling Tour for the 2007-08 season. This was the sixteenth time the event has taken place, and the third time since it was switched to joint men's/women's format. The event was held at the Mile One Centre in St. John's, Newfoundland and Labrador April 15–20. Since the event is a part of the Olympic qualifying process in Canada, only Canadian teams were invited. The total purse for each event is $100,000.

2008 Winners:
 Glenn Howard
 Amber Holland

Both of these teams were awarded 40 CTRS points for their feats at the tournament.

Men's

Teams
Key: CTRS refers to the CCA rankings and WCT refers to the money list ranking on the World Curling Tour.

A event

B Event

C Event

Championship

Women's

Teams
Key: CTRS refers to the CCA rankings and WCT refers to the money list ranking on the Women's World Curling Tour.

A event

B Event

C Event

Championship

Notes

References

External links
2008 TYLENOL Players' Championship news

Players Championships, 2008
Sport in St. John's, Newfoundland and Labrador
Curling in Newfoundland and Labrador
Players' Championship
2008 in Newfoundland and Labrador
April 2008 sports events in Canada